Kinshuk Debnath (born 8 May 1985) is an Indian professional footballer who plays as a defender for FC Bengaluru United.

Honours

Club
Mohun Bagan
I-League: 2014–15
Federation Cup: 2015–16

Atlético de Kolkata
Indian Super League: 2014, 2016

References

External links 
 Indian Super League Profile.
 Mohun Bagan interview.

1985 births
Living people
Indian footballers
United SC players
Mohun Bagan AC players
Mohammedan SC (Kolkata) players
East Bengal Club players
Association football defenders
People from Hooghly district
Footballers from West Bengal
Calcutta Football League players
I-League players
I-League 2nd Division players
Indian Super League players
Aryan FC players
Mumbai City FC players
Bhawanipore FC players
ATK (football club) players